Renato Dias Santos (born January 28, 1987 in Santo André), or simply Renato, is a Brazilian striker. He currently plays for SV Horn in Austria.

Honours
São Paulo State League: 2001
Paraná State League: 2005

External links
 
  

1987 births
Living people
Brazilian footballers
Esporte Clube Santo André players
Club Athletico Paranaense players
Clube Atlético Juventus players
Association football forwards